de Toni (sometimes capitalized as "De Toni") is an Italian surname. Notable people with the surname include:

Giovanni Battista de Toni (1864–1924), Italian botanist, mycologist, and phycologist
Manuel de Toni (born 1979), Italian ice hockey player
Lino De Toni (born 1972), Italian ice hockey player

Patronymic surnames